The Dawa Okote mine is one of the largest gold mines in Ethiopia and the world. It is located in the central Oromia Region. The mine has estimated reserves of 20.035 million oz of gold.

See also
Gewane-Mille mine

References

Gold mines in Ethiopia